Bengt Frännfors (born 26 February 1936) is a Swedish wrestler. He competed in two events at the 1960 Summer Olympics.

References

External links
 

1936 births
Living people
Swedish male sport wrestlers
Olympic wrestlers of Sweden
Wrestlers at the 1960 Summer Olympics
People from Kiruna Municipality
Sportspeople from Norrbotten County
20th-century Swedish people